Colobothea simillima is a species of beetle in the family Cerambycidae. It was described by Per Olof Christopher Aurivillius in 1902. It is known from Brazil, Uruguay, Argentina and Paraguay.

References

simillima
Beetles described in 1902